Bagdad is a small town  north of Hobart, Tasmania. It is in the Southern Midlands Council.

In the days of the horse and buggy, Bagdad was an important rest area and horse-changing place for those continuing their journey up Constitution Hill. It is now an area of orchards and small mixed farms and a commuter settlement.

History
The town was named by the explorer Hugh Germain, a private in the Royal Marines. He was said by James Backhouse in his book "A Narrative of a Visit to the Australian Colonies", published in 1901, to carry two books in his saddlebags while traveling: the Bible and the Arabian Nights, which he used as inspiration when he named places.

Bagdad Post Office opened on 1 December 1878.

A railway line connected the town with Hobart from 1891 until 1947.

In April 2003, during the early part of the Iraq war, the town's website was bombarded by confused internet users from around the world trying to contact Iraqis.

Demographics
The 2006 Census by the Australian Bureau of Statistics counted 996 persons in Bagdad on census night. Of these, 51.7% were male and 48.3% were female.

The majority of residents (86.9%) are of Australian birth, with another 2.6% from England.

The age distribution of Bagdad residents is comparable to that of the greater Australian population. 62.8% of residents were over 25 years in 2006, compared to the Australian average of 66.5%; and 37.2% were younger than 25 years, compared to the Australian average of 33.5%.

Community

Schools
Bagdad Primary School was established on 14 January 1867 with a total of 22 students.

Fire destroyed the school's three classrooms on 26 January 1954, forcing the pupils to attend temporary schooling at the Bagdad Community Hall. The original headmaster's house survives as a classroom for kindergarten students.

Transport
Bagdad is located on the Midland Highway, which connects Hobart and Launceston.

References

External links
Southern Midlands Council
2006 ABS Census Data by Location

Towns in Tasmania
Localities of Southern Midlands Council